Elections to the Preston City Council took place on 3 May 2007.

Preston council is elected "in thirds" which means one councillor from each three-member ward, and councillors from selected two-member wards, are elected each year, with one year free from all elections to ensure all councillors serve a full term.

Due to the "in thirds" system, these election results are compared to the 2003 Preston Council election. Councillors elected this year will defend their seats four years later in 2011.

For further information, see Preston local elections

Ashton

The two-member Ashton division is a suburban ward in the north-west of the city. It has a number of schools in its borders. The ward is predominantly used as a commuting hub although recent increases in student numbers has seen the terraces used for multi-occupancy housing.

Brookfield

In the north east of the city, the predominantly low income housing of Brookfield is a three-member ward. Buttressed up against Ribbleton and the rural east, and wedge-shaped to the south of Fulwood, the ward has been troubled by increasing levels of crime in recent years. Parts of the ward were formerly within the Fulwood district council and maintain the look of the affluent northern quarters of the city.

College

Created in the last round of local boundary reviews, the two-member College ward centres on two Fulwood employers. Preston College has a catchment area far beyond the city itself, whilst the recently closed Sharoe Green hospital has had many of its services re-directed to the Royal Preston Hospital. There are a mix of commuter and student housing and an increasing Muslim population.

Deepdale

Two member Deepdale was once reportedly the most deprived in England, and remains a ward of notable problems in health and housing. The ward contains Preston North End's Deepdale stadium and some of the oldest terraced housing in the city.

Garrison

Centred on Fulwood Barracks, this is a three-member ward created by the last round of boundary reviews. It is set in a heavily small "c" conservative part of Preston with a number of schools and small employment centres.

Greyfriars

Its name coming from a large private estate within its boundaries, Greyfriars is one of the oldest names connected to Preston's history. It includes the Pius X Preparatory school and Fulwood's leisure centre. An increasing number of comfortable suburban houses has been built on the fringes of the ward, which also borders Ingol Golf Course.

Ingol

Ingol ward is in the north west of the city, bordered by Greyfriars and to the south of the M55 motorway. The ward contains two main population areas, Ingol and Tanterton. The latter has had problems with drugs and crime over recent years but this is beginning to improve. Parts of the ward are comfortable with some commuter areas and houses neighbouring the Lancaster canal. There are still pockets of troubled communities.

With two councillors elected in the 2003 elections, there can be no direct comparison between results.

Larches

In the west of the city, around 30 minutes from the city centre, Larches is a box-shaped ward from the Riversway dual-carriageway into Blackpool to Haslam Park. It contains two post-war housing estates, Larches and Savick, and an area of suburban sprawl moved in from Ashton following boundary changes. The ward contains the whole of Ashton Park.

Lea

The three member ward of Lea contains the small Fylde border town of Lea Town, the urban Lea community and the sprawling green-belt community of Cottam. The ward follows the parish council boundary of Lea & Cottam Parish Council. Cottam has grown from a small farming community to a large private housing development populated by young families and business people.

Moor Park

Based on the Plungington community and bordering both the neat suburban terraces of southern Fulwood and the University of Central Lancashire campus, the Moor Park ward has a high number of student housing in converted Victorian housing and neater family houses. Moor Park itself is included in this ward, in the shadow of Deepdale football stadium.

Preston Rural East

The large Rural East wards contains the Amounderness, Broughton and Grimsargh communities in the north and east of the city.

Preston Rural North

Over reaching across the city of Preston is the large Preston Rural North ward, which includes the M6 and M55 motorways and acres of market towns, farming communities and rural areas. The boroughs of Fylde and Wyre border this northern ward, which is a three-member ward.

Ribbleton

Ribbleton, in the east of the city, grew massively as council housing was built around former mill worker terraces; now the ward is one of the largest in area in size{ and shows all the expected issues of high level crime and deprivation. Ribbleton, in common with the neighbouring Brookfield ward, is overwhelmingly white working class.

Riversway

The Riversway ward has three distinct elements. Broadgate, a comfortable estate of Victorian housing with a high percentage of student housing; new build housing on the former British Aerospace site; and the redeveloped marina. The former Preston Port, one of the largest in its time, has been redeveloped to feature shopping units and new build housing of some considerable expense. The Preston Docks and surrounding area has a sizable area of Development including new Supermarkets, Car dealers and trade outlets.

A Hindu temple, Lancashire County Council's headquarters and Preston's railway station are in the Riversway ward.

Sharoe Green

Lodged in the south-central area of Fulwood, the Sharoe Green ward is based on the former hospital and surrounding commuter belt environs.

St Matthews

A wedge-shaped ward in between the streets of Ribbleton and the city centre, this ward contains some deprived housing in the process of renewal, and in the recent months expensive new-build conversions.

Town Centre

Formed by boundary changes prior to Preston being awarded city status, Town Centre is the largest non-rural ward in the borough. There are three distinct parts to this central seat, namely Avenham, Frenchwood and the city centre itself.

The ward includes student developments and converted student homes in Avenham; expensive new build developments around the historic Winckley Square; and the Frenchwood area on the banks of the River Ribble. Avenham was notorious for high levels of crime and deprivation, but this is turning around with the establishment of community groups and private housing associations funding renewal. There is a sizable Muslim population in Avenham and Frenchwood.

Tulketh

Tulketh ward is a central and entirely urban ward north of the University complex, and to the east of Ashton. Its main population areas are traditional terrace housing, which mixes families with small shops including the Lane Ends shopping village and student housing.

University

Shaped around the outskirts of the city centre, this butterfly-wing shaped ward was formed following the recent boundary changes. It took from the oversized Riversway ward electors from the St Pauls and Maudland areas as well as the University campus itself. It is a two-member ward. It is populated by a mixture of student halls and terrace houses, with just less than half of the population being students.
2001 Census Information

References
Preston City Council election results

See also
 Preston (UK Parliament constituency)

2007 English local elections
2007
2000s in Lancashire